Google URL Shortener, also known as goo.gl, was a URL shortening service owned by Google. It was launched in December 2009, initially used for Google Toolbar and Feedburner. The company launched a separate website, goo.gl, in September 2010.  

The user could access a list of URLs that had been shortened in the past after logging in to their Google Account. Real-time analytics data, including traffic over time, top referrers, and visitor profiles was recorded. For security, Google added automatic spam system detection based on the same type of filtering technology used in Gmail.

The service has not been accepting new users since April 13, 2018 and Google discontinued the service for existing users on March 30, 2019. Links previously created still redirect to their previous destination. It was succeeded by Firebase Dynamic Links, but existing links did not become Dynamic Links automatically.

References 

URL Shortener
URL Shortener
URL-shortening services
Internet properties established in 2009
Internet properties disestablished in 2019